Initiation is the sixth album by American musician Todd Rundgren, released May 23, 1975 on Bearsville Records. With this album, Rundgren fully embraced the synthesized prog sound he had begun exploring in more depth in his work with his band Utopia.  However, unlike Utopia, in which Rundgren had limited himself to playing guitar, most of the synthesizers on Initiation were played and programmed by Rundgren himself.

Content
At over sixty-seven minutes, Initiation is one of the longest commercially-released LPs. Due to a plastic shortage, in order to keep the album on one vinyl LP, Rundgren had to limit and EQ the master so the bass response was rolled off to keep the grooves small enough to cut onto a single disc, he also had to speed up the first half of Side One (Real Man-Eastern Intrigue)and speed up the entirety of Side Two to eliminate 2-3 minutes from each side(5). The album's original inner sleeve included a note which stated: "Technical note: Due to the amount of music on this disc (over one hour), two points must be emphasized. Firstly, if your needle is worn or damaged, it will ruin the disc immediately. Secondly, if the sound does seem not loud enough on your system, try re-recording the music onto tape. By the way, thanks for buying the album."

The titles and concept are taken directly from Alice A. Bailey's book A Treatise on Cosmic Fire.

Critical reception
In The Illustrated New Musical Express Encyclopedia of Rock, Nick Logan and Bob Woffinden wrote, "Initiation (1975), despite the pretentious flirtations with half-baked versions of Zen Buddhism and Alice A. Bailey's "A Treatise On Cosmic Fire" that influenced his lyrics and Eastern mystic scores, contained a perceptible undercurrent of his former melodic invention while one could ascertain traces of self-parody and wry humorous debunking of what Rundgren appeared on the other hand to be holding up as valid. At a shade over one hour Initiation is also amongst the longest albums ever made, evidence of his engineering abilities, if not his sense of self-control".

Influence
When asked if Rundgren had influenced his music, with perceived influences of Initiation on Queen Elizabeth and Rite², Julian Cope responded that he and Thighpaulsandra loved "A Treatise on Cosmic Fire", "but we both bemoaned the fact that it was recorded so long before ambient music had been defined that Todd treated it as an ever-evolving, almost prog-rock piece. We both loved huge elements of that piece but found that we never listened to it. So we tried to build that Todd-like transcendence into our own piece of music [with Queen Elizabeth]."

Track listing
All tracks are written by Todd Rundgren.

Side one
"Real Man" – 4:25
"Born to Synthesize" – 3:40
"The Death of Rock and Roll" – 3:48
"Eastern Intrigue" – 5:06
"Initiation" – 7:05
"Fair Warning" – 8:07

Side two
"A Treatise on Cosmic Fire" (Instrumental) – 36:00
 "Intro - Prana" – 4:27
 "II. The Fire of Mind - or: Solar Fire" – 3:43
 "III. The Fire of Spirit - or: Electric Fire" – 7:34
 "I. The Internal Fire - or: Fire by Friction" – 20:16
 "Mûlâdhâra: The Dance of Kundalini"
 "Svâdhishthâna: Bam, Bham, Mam, Yam, Ram, Lam, Thank You, Mahm"
 "Manipûra: Seat of Fire"
 "Anâhata: The Halls of Air"
 "Vishudda: Sounds Beyond Ears"
 "Ajnâ: Sights Beyond Eyes"
 "Brahmarandhra: Nirvana Shakri"
 "Outro - Prana"

Personnel

"Real Man” (Recorded at Secret Sound Studio)
 Todd Rundgren – vocals, guitar, piano, synthesizer, RMI Keyboard Computer, ARP String Ensemble, percussion
 Moogy Klingman – RMI Keyboard Computer
 Ralph Schuckett – clavinet
 John Siegler – bass
 Kevin Ellman – drums

"Born to Synthesize” (Recorded at Bearsville Sound Studio)
 Todd Rundgren – vocals
 Roger Powell – synthesizer treatments

"The Death of Rock and Roll" (Recorded at Mediasound Studio)
 Todd Rundgren – vocals, guitars
 Ralph Schuckett – clavinet
 Rick Derringer – bass
 Kevin Ellman, John Wilcox – drums

"Eastern Intrigue” (Recorded at Secret Sound Studio)
 Todd Rundgren – vocals, electric sitar, electric piano, RMI Keyboard Computer, ARP String Ensemble, additional percussion
 John Miller – bass
 Roy Markowitz – drums
 Lee Pastora – congas, bongos
 Barbara Burton – percussion
 Roger Powell - nose flute

"Initiation” (Recorded at Mediasound Studio)
 Todd Rundgren – vocals, lead guitar, clavinet, synthesizer, RMI Keyboard Computer, ARP String Ensemble
 Bob Rose – rhythm guitar
 John Siegler – bass
 Rick Marotta, Bernard Purdie – drums
 Lee Pastora – congas
 David Sanborn – saxophone solo
 Roger Powell – synthesizer solo

"Fair Warning” (Recorded at Mediasound Studio)
 Todd Rundgren – vocals, piano, electric sitar, RMI Keyboard Computer, ARP String Ensemble
 Moogy Klingman – organ
 Rick Derringer – guitar
 Dan Hartman – bass
 Chris Parker, Barry Lazarowitz – drums
 Edgar Winter – saxophone

"A Treatise on Cosmic Fire" (Recorded at Secret Sound and Bearsville Sound Studios)
 Todd Rundgren – all instruments
 Roger Powell – synthesizer programming, "creative assistance"

Production
 Todd Rundgren – writing, production, arrangement, mixing, and engineering ("Real Man", "Born to Synthesize", "A Treatise on Cosmic Fire")
 Jack Malken - engineering (all other tracks)

Charts
Album

"Real Man"

References

  5. Richard Robinson - Crawdaddy Magazine - July 1975 "Todd was born to synthesize"

Todd Rundgren albums
1975 albums
Albums produced by Todd Rundgren
Bearsville Records albums
Rhino Records albums